Watt/I-80 station is a below-grade light rail station on the Blue Line of the Sacramento RT Light Rail system operated by the Sacramento Regional Transit District. The station is located in the median of Interstate 80 at its intersection of Watt Avenue, after which the station is named, in the city of North Highlands, California.

Watt/I-80 station was the original northern terminus of the RT Light Rail system and it remains the northern terminus of today's Blue Line.

The station has had issues with broken elevators, poor signage, poor cleanliness, and safety. A study proposed closing the elevator on the east side of the station, building new stairs and elevators on west side, and moving many bus transfers to the Roseville Road station. The proposals are opposed by transit advocates.

The station, along with a bus transfer platform and a 243 space park and ride lot, reused a partially built, but later abandoned freeway project.

The park and ride lot is poorly utilized, with an average of just six cars. A study blamed the poor utilization on long walk between the lot and the station, safety concerns at the station, and the Roseville Road station's superior design for passengers arriving by car.

Platforms and tracks 
The station includes a park-and-ride and a bus transfer center. It is one of the busiest bus/light rail transfer points in the Sacramento Regional Transit District. It is also the only 2-level light rail station in the system: light rail, peak commute buses, and a Placer County Transit bus route to Auburn use the lower level in the I-80 median, while all daily routes use the Watt Avenue overpass on the upper level.

References 

Sacramento Regional Transit light rail stations
Railway stations in the United States opened in 1987
Railway stations in highway medians